The CBBC Official Chart Show is a British children's entertainment series presented by Cel Spellman with Yasser Ranjha and Millie Lloyd as relief presenters. The show first aired on the CBBC network on 10 May 2015 and ended on 17 February 2017. The series was replaced by a new show taking over from April 2017 by The Playlist.

Format
From 10 May 2015 until 5 July 2015 the CBBC Official Chart Show aired from 6.30pm until 7.00pm. It counted down the top 10 tracks of the weeks plus games. The time to announce number 1 came at the same time on The radio 1 Show. On 4 September 2015 the show returned, this time from 5.20pm until 5.50pm on a Friday. It aired until 18 December 2015.

The show returned on 12 March 2016 and for the first three episodes, which aired on Saturdays from 9.50am until 10.20am, were pre-recorded. The show moved to Fridays on 1 April, live, from 5.15pm until 5.45pm. In the second half of the second series the show moved to 7.00pm until 7.30pm. In this series the show was revamped, with viewers being able to vote for 3 songs that would be played on the show under the title 'the playlist'. For the Christmas Special in 2016, the show moved back to a late afternoon slot, 5.30pm until 6.05pm. There were more games, and the chart was shown at the end of the episode in one block. 

Whilst the series was not on air a video of the chart was published on the CBBC website. In the break between series 1 and 2, the video was shown on CBBC every Friday at 6.30pm.

Presenters
Cel Spellman hosted the show since it began in May 2015 till it ended in February 2017. When he was unavailable, relief presenters presented the show for him.

On 29 April, 6 and 20 May and 21 October 2016 the show was presented by Yasser. Yasser and Spellman both presented on 22 July 2016.

Episodes

References

External links
 

BBC children's television shows
2015 British television series debuts
2017 British television series endings
2010s British children's television series
BBC high definition shows
English-language television shows
2010s British music television series